Nicolosi is a commune in Italy.

Nicolosi may also refer to:

Surname
 Barbara Nicolosi (born 1964), American screenwriter
 Francesco Nicolosi (born 1954), Italian pianist
 Joseph Nicolosi (1947–2017), American clinical psychologist
 Nicolò Nicolosi (1912–1986), Italian football player and manager
 Roberto Nicolosi (1914–1989), Italian musician
 Salvatore Nicolosi (1922–2014), Italian Catholic Prelate
 Valeria Nicolosi, nanotechnologist
  (born 1934), Argentinian musician and composer
  (born 1966), Italian actor

Other uses 
 Nicolosi Productions, an Italian record label
 Nicolosi globular projection, a map invented by the Iranian Golden Age polymath al-Biruni and reworked by Nicolosi in 1660.

Italian-language surnames